Tonkunst, "Sound Art" or more literally "The Art of Tone", is an obsolete term in the German language applied to art music of the 19th century, and often used in music history and musical aesthetic representations. It probably originated from the need to give the music a place among the classical arts like architecture, sculpture, painting, prose and poetry, and also recognize the composer or musician as a creative individual. The term is found for example referring to performances by Liszt and Wagner, and in the inscriptions of the Walhalla memorial built in 1842, where a good example is Joseph Haydn, titled as "Doctor der Tonkunst" ("Doctor of Sound-Art"), and Ludwig van Beethoven as "Tondichter" ("Sound-poet"). Today the term is rarely used, but lives on, for example, in the name of the Tonkünstler Orchestra.

References

Attribution
This article is based on the translation of the corresponding article of the German Wikipedia. A list of contributors can be found there at the History section.

German words and phrases
Musicology
Music education

no:Lydkunst